A list of notable politicians of the Christian Social Union in Bavaria (CSU):

A
 Manfred Ach
 Heinrich Aigner
 Ilse Aigner
 Katrin Albsteiger
 Max Allwein
 Walter Althammer
 Hans Amler
 Erwin Ammann
 Johann Anetseder
 Willi Ankermüller
 Anton von Aretin
 Klaus P. Arnold
 Artur Auernhammer

B
 Günther Babel
 Martin Bachhuber
 Georg Bachmann
 Rudolf Bachmann
 Margarete Balk
 Siegfried Balke
 Siegfried Balleis
 Dorothee Bär
 Christian Baretti
 Georg Barfuß
 Richard Bartsch
 Julia Bartz
 Josef Bauer
 Marie Baum
 Wilhelm Baumann
 Leonhard Baumeister
 Gertrud Bäumer
 Joseph Baumgartner
 Jürgen Baumgärtner
 Elisabeth Bauriedel
 Winfried Bausback
 Alfred Bayer
 Konstantin Prinz von Bayern
 Martin Bayerstorfer
 Walter Becher
 Pia Beckmann
 Günther Beckstein
 Rupert Berger
 Mathilde Berghofer-Weichner
 Otmar Bernhard
 Christian Bernreiter
 Anton Besold
 Karl Bickleder
 Annemarie Biechl
 Alfred Biehle
 Renate Blank
 Gerhard Bletschacher
 Markus Blume
 Reinhold Bocklet
 Hans Bodensteiner
 Johann Böhm (CSU)
 Stefan Bosse
 Wolfgang Bötsch
 Uwe Brandl
 Georg Brauchle
 Luitpold Braun
 Klaus Dieter Breitschwert
 Gudrun Brendel-Fischer
 Maximilian Brückner
 Helmut Brunner
 Waltraud Bundschuh
 Peter Bürgel
 Ralph Burkei

C
 Roland Cantzler
 Manfred Christ

D
 Wolfgang Dandorfer
 Valentin Dasch
 Peter Deeg
 Josef Deimer
 Leonhard Deininger
 Maria Deku
 Franz Josef Delonge
 Marianne Deml
 Hans Demmelmeier
 Günther Denzler
 Albert Deß
 Petra Dettenhöfer
 Alfred Dick
 Matthias Dießl
 Paul Diethei
 Anton Dietrich 
 Ernst Dietz
 Adolf Dinglreiter
 Stefan Dittrich
 Konrad Dobler
 Alexander Dobrindt
 Renate Dodell
 Karl Döhler
 Werner Dollinger
 Anton Donhauser
 Heinz Donhauser
 Toni Donhauser
 Hans Drachsler
 Alfred Dreier
 Hansjörg Durz

E
 Rudolf Eberhard
 Gerhard Eck
 Walter Eckhardt
 Kurt Eckstein
 Hans Ehard
 Georg Ehnes
 Gottfried Eichelbrönner
 Hans Eisenmann
 Georg Eisenreich
 Peter Eismann
 Rudolf Engelhard
 Matthias Engelsberger
 Egon Erzum
 Herbert Ettengruber
 Walter Eykmann

F
 Bernd Fabritius
 Georg Fahrenschon
 Kurt Faltlhauser
 Hermann Fellner
 Markus Ferber
 Adolf Fetsch
 Otto Freiherr von Feury
 Ingrid Fickler
 Conrad Fink
 Martin Fink
 Max Fischer
 Herbert Frankenhauser
 Ludwig Franz
 Max Frauendorfer
 Karl Freller
 Heinrich Frey
 Walburga Fricke
 Hans-Peter Friedrich
 Ingo Friedrich
 Klaus-Dieter Fritsche
 Otto Frommknecht
 Gustav Fuchs
 Karl Fuchs
 Joseph-Ernst Graf Fugger von Glött
 Friedrich Funk
 Albert Füracker

G
 Peter Gauweiler
 Norbert Geis
 Franz Gleissner
 Michael Glos
 Alois Glück
 Alfons Goppel
 Thomas Goppel
 Enoch zu Guttenberg
 Karl Theodor Freiherr von und zu Guttenberg
 Karl-Theodor zu Guttenberg

H
 Otto von Habsburg
 Georg Hackl
 Christine Haderthauer
 Franz Handlos
 Gerda Hasselfeldt
 August Haußleiter
 Georg Graf Henckel von Donnersmarck
 Joachim Herrmann
 Friedrich August von der Heydte
 Hermann Höcherl
 Monika Hohlmeier
 Heinz Hohner
 Erwin Huber
 Alois Hundhammer

J
 Richard Jaeger
 Max Jüngling

K
 Bartholomäus Kalb
 Alois Karl
 Martin Kastler
 Erwin Georg Keilholz
 Ignaz Kiechle
 Hans Klein
 Rudolf Kraus

L
 Carljörg Lacherbauer
 Heinrich Lades
 Hans Ritter von Lex

M
 Alfred Mechtersheimer
 Peter Menacher
 Philipp Meyer
 Marlene Mortler
 Gerd Müller
 Hans Müller
 Helmut Müller
 Josef Müller
 Nikolaus Müller

N
 Angelika Niebler
 Wilhelm Niklas

O
 Melanie Oßwald
 Eduard Oswald

P
 Hans-Jürgen Papier
 Gabriele Pauli
 Heinrich von Pierer
 Bernd Posselt
 Josef Prentl
 Albert Probst
 Maria Probst

R
 Alexander Radwan
 Hans Rampf
 Peter Ramsauer
 Bolko von Richthofen
 Erich Riedl
 Franz Rieger
 Hannelore Roedel

S
 Maria-Elisabeth Schaeffler
 Fritz Schäffer
 Hans Schaidinger
 Karl Scharnagl
 Andreas Scheuer
 Peter Schmidhuber
 Christian Schmidt
 Siegfried Schneider
 Ludwig Scholz
 Karlheinz Schreiber
 Hans Schuberth
 Horst Seehofer
 Hanns Seidel
 Hans Joachim Sewering
 Johannes Singhammer
 Markus Söder
 Carl-Dieter Spranger
 Karl Graf von Spreti
 Barbara Stamm
 Georg Stang
 Heinz Starke
 Franz-Ludwig Schenk Graf von Stauffenberg
 Gabriele Stauner
 Adam Stegerwald
 Edmund Stoiber
 Hermann Strathmann
 Franz Josef Strauß
 Max Streibl
 Richard Stücklen

T
 Gloria von Thurn und Taxis

U
 Hans-Peter Uhl

W
 Theo Waigel
 Jürgen Warnke
 Manfred Weber
 Otto Weinkamm
 Anja Weisgerber
 Manfred Weiß
 Otto Wiesheu
 Wolfgang Wild
 Paul Wilhelm
 Josef Wintrich
 Fritz Wittmann
 Dagmar Wöhrl
 Joachim Wuermeling

Z
 
 Friedrich Zimmermann

 
Christian Social Union of Bavaria